The 1924 Ohio Green and White football team was an American football team that represented Ohio University in the Ohio Athletic Conference (OAC) during the 1924 college football season. The team compiled a 4–4 record (2–4 against conference opponents), finished in 14th place out of 20 teams in the OAC, and outscored opponents by a total of 64 to 59.

In January 1924, Don Peden was hired as the head football coach at Ohio University. He had been an assistant coach at the school in 1923 and took over from John C. Heldt. He continued as head coach for at Ohio University through the 1946 season, compiling a record of 121–46–11.

Schedule

References

Ohio
Ohio Bobcats football seasons
Ohio Green and White football